Dessalines is an arrondissement in the Artibonite department of Haiti. The arrondissement is named after its main city, Dessalines. The city, in turn, is named after the Haitian Revolution leader Jean-Jacques Dessalines. The arrondissement contains four communes: the city of Dessalines, Desdunes, Grande Saline, and Petite Rivière de l'Artibonite.

Arrondissements of Haiti
Artibonite (department)